Nigel John Spearing (8 October 1930 – 8 January 2017) was a British Labour Party politician.

Nigel Spearing was born in Hammersmith, London, and educated at Latymer Upper School, Hammersmith and St Catharine's College, Cambridge. After graduating in 1956, he worked as a tutor and teacher, firstly at Wandsworth School (1956–68) and then at Elliott School, Putney (1969–70). After coming second in Warwick and Leamington in 1964, Spearing was elected as the Labour Member of Parliament for Acton at the 1970 general election, regaining a seat which the Labour Party had lost to the Conservative Kenneth Baker in a 1968 by-election. Spearing turned Baker's by-election majority of 3,720 into a Labour majority of 660. Prior to the February 1974 general election, the Acton constituency underwent major boundary changes and he was defeated in his bid for re-election by the Conservative Party candidate George Young by 1,451 votes.

Spearing then returned to parliament a few weeks later after winning the Newham South by-election (caused by the constituency's MP, Elwyn Jones, being made a life peer in order to take on the role of Lord Chancellor) with a majority of 9,321. This was the only by-election held in the February–October 1974 Parliament. Spearing was then re-elected at the October 1974 general election, and held the Newham South seat until 1997, when the seat was abolished. Spearing and a neighbouring Labour MP Mildred Gordon both applied for the newly created seat of Poplar and Canning Town, but both were passed over in favour of local Labour politician and firefighter Jim Fitzpatrick.

Spearing was opposed to British membership of the European Economic Community. Although he was interested in many issues, including transport, he devoted much of his time to campaigning against the EEC/EU, not least because he believed that 'many of the most pressing domestic political issues of the day could also be firmly connected with European Union institutions and directives.'

References

Sources
Times Guide to the House of Commons, 1992 and 1997 editions.

Personal Papers

 Nigel Spearing deposited a set of his personal papers relating to education and government to the Institute of Education at the University of London in March 2006. Archives of the Institute of Education (archive reference: GBR/0366/NS)
 The Papers of Nigel Spearing held at Churchill Archives Centre

1930 births
2017 deaths
Labour Party (UK) MPs for English constituencies
UK MPs 1970–1974
UK MPs 1974
UK MPs 1974–1979
UK MPs 1979–1983
UK MPs 1983–1987
UK MPs 1987–1992
UK MPs 1992–1997
Alumni of St Catharine's College, Cambridge
People from Hammersmith
People educated at Latymer Upper School